Marek Lisoň (born 15 September 1990) is a Slovak professional ice hockey player who played with HC Slovan Bratislava in the Slovak Extraliga.

References

Living people
HC Slovan Bratislava players
Slovak ice hockey left wingers
1990 births
Ice hockey people from Bratislava
HC '05 Banská Bystrica players
Bratislava Capitals players
HK Trnava players
ŠHK 37 Piešťany players